Grant T. Burgoyne (born August 9, 1953) is an American attorney, politician, and a Democratic member of the Idaho Senate representing Idaho's District 16. Burgoyne was born on August 9, 1953, in Ketchikan, Alaska.

Elections

References

External links
Grant Burgoyne at the Idaho Legislature
 

1953 births
Living people
Boise State University faculty
Democratic Party members of the Idaho House of Representatives
Democratic Party Idaho state senators
People from Boise, Idaho
People from Ketchikan, Alaska
University of Idaho alumni
University of Kansas School of Law alumni
21st-century American politicians